Thomas Mayo Brewer publishes part of North American Oology
Charles Lucien Bonaparte dies of natural causes. Martin Lichtenstein dies after suffering a stroke.
August von Pelzeln becomes Curator of birds at Kaiserlichen Hof-Naturalien-Cabinet in Vienna.
Birds described in 1857 include black-tailed gnatcatcher, bristlebill, dwarf cassowary, plumed guineafowl, square-tailed nightjar, Thekla lark
Philip Sclater publishes A monograph of the birds forming the tanagrine genus Calliste
Gustav Hartlaub publishes System der Ornithologie West Afrika's
Charles de Souancé publishes Iconographie des perroquets, non figurés dans les publications de Levaillant et de M. Bourjot Saint-Hilaire, in collaboration with Charles Lucien Bonaparte and Émile Blanchard, Paris : P. Bertrand, 1857
Expeditions
1857–1860 SMS Novara Ornithology directed by  Johann Zelebor.

Ongoing events

John Gould The birds of Australia; Supplement 1851–69. 1 vol. 81 plates; Artists: J. Gould and H. C. Richter; Lithographer: H. C. Richter
John Gould The birds of Asia; 1850-83 7 vols. 530 plates, Artists: J. Gould, H. C. Richter, W. Hart and J. Wolf; Lithographers:H. C. Richter and W. Hart

References

Bird
Birding and ornithology by year